Christopher J. McFadden (born August 9, 1957) is an American lawyer and Judge on the Georgia Court of Appeals.

Biography

McFadden was born August 9, 1957 in Akron, Ohio. He received his Bachelor of Arts from Oglethorpe University in 1980 and his Juris Doctor from the University of Georgia School of Law in 1985. He practiced as a sole practitioner in Decatur from 1988 until his election to Georgia the Court of Appeals in November 2010. He is currently serving his second five-year term.

McFadden is married to Dr. Linda Hyde, Professor of Biology at Gordon State College in Barnesville, Georgia. They have a son.

References

External links
Official Biography on Georgia Court of Appeals website

1957 births
Living people
Georgia Court of Appeals judges
Georgia (U.S. state) lawyers
Oglethorpe University alumni
People from Akron, Ohio
University of Georgia School of Law alumni
20th-century American lawyers
21st-century American lawyers
21st-century American judges
Federalist Society members